Thomas Fröschl (born 20 September 1988) is an Austrian footballer who plays for ASK St. Valentin.

References

External links

 Thomas Fröschl Interview

Austrian footballers
Austrian Football Bundesliga players
2. Liga (Austria) players
SC Wiener Neustadt players
1988 births
Living people
DSV Leoben players
FC Lustenau players
SKN St. Pölten players
SV Ried players
LASK players
FC Blau-Weiß Linz players
Association football forwards
People from Steyr
Footballers from Upper Austria